This is a list of gliders/sailplanes of the world, (this reference lists all gliders with references, where available) 
Note: Any aircraft can glide for a short time, but gliders are designed to glide for longer.

R

Raciti
(A. Raciti)
 Raciti Grifone

Raab
(Fritz Raab)
 Raab R2
 Raab Doppelraab
 Raab Krähe
 Pützer Motorraab – built by Alfons Pützer

Raab-Katzenstein 
(Raab-Katzenstein Flugzeugwerk GmbH (RaKa) - Antonius RAAB & Kurt KATZENSTEIN)
 Raab-Katzenstein RK-7 Schmetterling

Rackaři
 Rackaři ŠBK-1 Racek-1

Radab 
(Sven Olof Ridder & Harald Unden – Radab)
 Radab Windex 1100
 Radab Windex 1200C

Raddings-Locke
(J. E. Raddings & W. E. Locke / Hull Gliding Club, Hedon, Yorkshire, United Kingdom)
 Radlock Trainer

J. A. I. Reid
(J. A. I. Reid)
 Reid Small Glider

Reinhard
(Gerhard Reinhard)
 Reinhard Cumulus
 Reinhard Cirrus

Renard
(Charles Renard)
 Renard Décaplan Aéride

Rensselaer
(Rensselaer Polytechnic Institute)
 Rensselaer RP-1
 Rensselaer RP-2
 Rensselaer RP-3

REP
(Robert Esnault-Pelterie)
 REP Type-1
 REP Type-2

Reussner 
 Reussner J.C.R. 1
 Reussner Swift
 Reussner-Brown Biplace – Reussner, J. C. & Brown, T. A.

RFB
(Rhein-Flugzeugbau GmbH)
 Rhein Flugzeugbau RW-3
 RFB Sirius II

Ree-Miller
(Terry Miller & John Ree & Bill Ree)
 Ree-Miller Cherokee RM

Revallo
(Ján Revallo)
 Revallo R-1 Urpín

Reynard
(Reynard Glider Construction Co, Aylestone, Leicester, United Kingdom)
 Reynard R.4 Primary (aka Reynolds R.4 Primary?)

RFD 
(Reginald Foster Dagnall / R.F.D. Co )
 RFD Primary Type AT (Dagling)
 RFD 2 Sailplane

Richardson
(Geoff Richardson)
 Richardson Golden Eagle

Richter
(Hans Richter)
 Richter Möwe

Ridgefield
(Ridgefield Manufacturing Company of Ridgeville, NJ)
 Ridgefield PG-2 – powered CG-4

Ridley
(Cyril Ridley)
 Ridley 1910 glider

Riedel
(Peter Riedel)
 Riedel PR-1 – Peter Riedel
 Riedel PR-2 – Peter Riedel

Rimsa-Miliunas
(Z. Rimsa, G. Miliunas)
 Rimsa-Miliunas Keva motorglider
 Rimsa Keva

Rio Claro
(Aero Clube de Rio Claro)
 Rio Claro Araponga

RLM
(Reichsluftfahrtministerium – Reich Ministry of Aviation)
(Glider designations)
 108-10   Schneider Grunau 9 primary glider (1929)
 108-11   RRG Zögling 33 primary glider (1933)
 108-14   DFS Schulgleiter SG.38 standard basic gliding trainer (1938)
 108-15   RRG Zögling 12m primary glider (1934)
 108-16   Weber EW-2 four-seat high-performance sailplane
 108-21   Hirth Hi 21 two-seat sailplane
 108-22   Hirth Hi 20 MoSe (for Motorsegler = motor glider); motorized glider
 108-29   Fliege IIa primary glider (1935)
 108-30   DFS Kranich II two-seat sailplane (1935)
 108-47   Jacobs Rhönadler single-seat high-performance sailplane (1932)
 108-48   Dittmar Condor I high-performance sailplane (1932)
 108-49   Schneider Grunau Baby II glider (1932)
 108-50   Jacobs Rhönbussard single-seat high-performance sailplane (1933)
 108-51   Jacobs Rhönsperber single-seat high-performance sailplane (1935)
 108-53   DFS Habicht single-seat acrobatics sailplane (1936)
 108-56   Dittmar Condor II single-seat high-performance sailplane (1935)
 108-58   Hirth Göppingen Gö 1 Wolf sailplane (1935)
 108-59   Hirth Göppingen Gö 3 Minimoa high-performance sailplane (1935)
 108-60   Jacobs Reiher single-seat high-performance sailplane (1937)
 108-61   Hütter / Schempp-Hirth Göppingen Gö 4 two-seat sailplane (1937)
 108-62   Schwarzwald-Flugzeugbau Donaueschingen Strolch high-performance sailplane
 108-63   Akaflieg München Mü13D Merlin high-performance sailplane (1936)
 108-64   Schwarzwald-Flugzeugbau Donaueschingen Ibis
 108-65   Dittmar / Schleicher Condor III single-seat high-performance sailplane (1938)
 108-66   Schneider Grunau Baby III sailplane (1938)
 108-67   Hütter Hü 17 sailplane (1937)
 108-68   Jacobs Weihe high-performance single-seat sailplane (1938)
 108-70   Jacobs Olympia Meise high-performance single-seat sailplane (1939)
 108-72   Akaflieg München Mü17 Merle high-performance sailplane (1939)
 108-74   FVA Aachen / Schmetz FVA 10b Rheinland high-performance sailplane

Roberts
(Donald Roberts)
 Roberts Cygnet

Roberts
(Frank Roberts)
 Roberts Primary

Robertson
( A. Robertson)
 Robertson Bamboo

Robinson
(John Robinson)
 Robinson Robin

Rochelt 
(Günther Rochelt)
 Rochelt Flair 30
 Rochelt Minair
 Rochelt Musculair I
 Rochelt Musculair II
 Rochelt Solair I
 Rochelt Solair II

Rolladen-Schneider
(Rolladen-Schneider Flugzeugbau GmbH / LS – Lemke-Schneider)
 Rolladen-Schneider LS1
 Rolladen-Schneider LS2
 Rolladen-Schneider LS3
 Rolladen-Schneider LS4
 Rolladen-Schneider LS5
 Rolladen-Schneider LS6
 Rolladen-Schneider LS7
 Rolladen-Schneider LS8
 Rolladen-Schneider LS9
 Rolladen-Schneider LS10
 Akaflieg Köln LS11
 Rolladen-Schneider LSD Ornith

Rolle
( J. Rollé)
 Rollé 1922 glider

Romeo
(Industrie Meccaniche e Aeronautiche Meridionali / Officine Meccaniche Romeo)
 Romeo Ro-35 (IMAM Ro-35)

Rosario
(Juvenelle Rosario – Florianópolis, Brazil)
 Rosario Skua

Ross
 Ross R-2 Ibis
 Ross R-3
 Ross RH-3
 Ross-Johnson RJ-5
 Ross R-6
 Ross-Stephens RS-1 Zanonia – Harland Ross & Harvey Stephens – Ross Stephens Aircraft Company of Montebello, California
 Ross-Stephens RS-3 Ibis – Harland Ross & Harvey Stephens – Ross-Stephens Aircraft Company of Montebello, California

Vernie Ross
(Vernie Ross)
 Ross Ranger I
 Ross Ranger II

Rostock
(Paul Krekel / Mecklenburgische Aero-Klub, Rostock')
 Rostock Primary
 Rostock M-I Baumeister
 Rostock M-II Mecklenburg
 Rostock M-III Rostock

Rostov
(Rostov Technical Institute)
 Rostov GT-1 Kaganovich

Rotondi 
(Gianfranco Rotondi)
 Rotondi R-1 Gheppio
 Rotondi R-2 Tobia

Rotter
(Lajos Rotter)
 Rotter Karakan – Lajos Rotter – Boy Scout Group "Ezermester" – MOVERO
 Rotter Nemere – Lajos Rotter – Hungarian Aircraft Repair Works, Székesfehérvár
 Janka-Rotter Vándor with Zoltán Janka
 Rotter-Ágotay 1922 glider with István Ágotay

Rousset
(Mauritius Rousset)
 Rousset glider

RRG
(Rhön-Rossitten Gesellschaft)
 RRG Urubu Obs
 RRG Delta I
 RRG Ente – Alexander Lippisch & Fritz Stam
 RRG Hangwind – Alexander Lippisch
 RRG Hols der Teufel – Alexander Lippisch
 RRG Professor
 RRG Prüfling
 RRG Falke
 RRG Schuldoppelsitzer
 RRG Storch I
 RRG Storch V
 RRG Wien
 RRG Zögling
 RRG Fafnir
 RRG Fafnir 2 (São Paulo)

Rubik
(Ernő Rubik – father of the Rubiks Cube inventor)
 MSrE M-20 alternatively Rubik R-01 (retrospectively) or EMESE-B.
 Rubik R-03 Szittya I
 Rubik R-04 Szittya II
 Rubik R-05 Vöcsök 
 Rubik R-06 Vöcsök 
 Rubik R-07
 Rubik R-08 Pilis
 Rubik Győr 3 Motor-Pilis, possibly R-09.
 Rubik R-10 Szittya III 
 Rubik R-11b Cimbora
 Rubik R-12 Kevély (Proud)
 Rubik R-15 Koma (Pard/Panthera)
 Rubik R-16 Lepke (Butterfly)
 Rubik R-17 Móka (Fun)
 Rubik R-20 (OE-01) 
 Rubik R-21
 Rubik R-22 Futár (Courier)
 Rubik R-23 Gébics (Shrike)
 Rubik R-24 Bibic (Lapwing)
 Rubik R-25 Mokány (Little Devil)
 Rubik R-25-4
 Rubik R-26 Góbé (Chieftain)
 Rubik R-27 Kópé (Scamp)
 Rubik R-29
 Rubik R-30
 Rubik R-31 Dupla (Double)
 Gyõr-3 Motor-Pilis (Gyõr Soaring Club, Gyõr)

Rudlicki 
(Jerzy Rudlicki)
 Rudlicki nr.1
 Rudlicki nr.2
 Rudlicki nr.3
 Rudlicki nr.7
 Rudlicki nr.8
 Rudlicki nr.9

Ruhm 
(UL RuhmAir Leichtflugzeuge / Mannfred Ruhm)
 Ruhmer Swift Light
 Ruhmer E-Swift
 Ruhmer Swift Light PAS

Ruppert
(Ruppert Composite GmbH)
 Ruppert Archaeopteryx

Rutan
(Rutan Aircraft Factory)
 Rutan Solitaire

Ryley
(Leslie G. Ryley / Coventry Aero Club)
 Ryley Dragon-Fly 1914

Ryson
(T. Claude Ryan and Son)
 Ryson ST-100 Cloudster
 Ryson STP-1 Swallow

Notes

Further reading

External links

Lists of glider aircraft